Alfa Mist is a British musician, producer, song-writer and MC based in Newham, London. He released his first solo EP Nocturne in 2015. He also runs a music label called Sekito. His music mixes hip-hop and club tropes with jazz improvisation. He collaborated with several musicians, including Jordan Rakei, Yussef Dayes and Tom Misch.

In 2021 he released an album titled Bring Backs on the American independent music label Anti-. He also performed at the 2021 We Out Here Festival and was one of the MOBO Awards 2021 nominees.

Early life
Alfa Mist was born in the United Kingdom and grew up in Newham, London. He went to Langdon Academy and Newham Sixth Form College. He originally wanted to become a professional footballer, but his mother wanted him to complete two years at college first. Alfa took three A-levels plus a BTEC in music composition. He began creating music at the age of 15. As a teenage hip-hop producer, his interest in sampling led him to discovering jazz and eventually teaching himself how to play piano, after watching his music tutor perform John Legend’s "Ordinary People".

Discography

Albums

Extended plays

References

External links

English jazz musicians
Rappers from London
Living people
People from the London Borough of Newham
Year of birth missing (living people)
Anti- (record label) artists